Pine Hill Cemetery may refer to:

Pine Hill Cemetery (Auburn, Alabama)
Pine Hill Cemetery (Davenport, Iowa)
Pine Hill Cemetery (Louisa, Kentucky)
Pine Hill Cemetery (Tewksbury, Massachusetts)
Pine Hill Cemetery (Dover, New Hampshire)
Pine Hill Cemetery (Durham, New Hampshire)
Pine Hill Cemetery (Hillsborough, New Hampshire)
Pine Hill Cemetery (Buffalo, New York)
Pine Hill Cemetery (Gowanda, New York)
Pine Hill Cemetery (Parma, New York)
Pine Hill Cemetery (Throop, New York)
Pine Hill Cemetery (Burlington, North Carolina)
Pine Hill Cemetery (Brandon, Vermont)